William Paul Zeller (October 26, 1983 – January 5, 2011) was an American computer programmer who was best known for creating the MyTunes application. After Zeller committed suicide in January 2011, his suicide note began circulating widely, launching a public discussion on the long-term ill effects of child sexual abuse.

Education
A native of Middletown, Connecticut, Zeller was pursuing a doctoral degree in computer science from Princeton, having earned his master's degree in 2008. He received his bachelor's degree from Trinity College, Hartford in 2006.

Career
His best-known software project was MyTunes, an enhancement for Apple's iTunes software that enables users to copy music between computers on a local network. During his undergraduate years he also created Zempt, an enhancement for the popular Moveable Type blogging platform. Zeller continued creating innovative software in graduate school. His most recent hit was Graph Your Inbox, an extension to the Chrome browser that allows GMail users to analyze patterns in their own email traffic. Graph Your Inbox appears to be no longer functional (as of April 2011), probably due to a change in the way Gmail works.

Zeller also served for more than two years as the computer science representative to Princeton's Graduate Student Government, advocating the interests of his fellow graduate students in housing, campus transportation, and other issues.

He co-authored an influential paper, called "Government Data and the Invisible Hand", that explained how governments can release public data in ways that will be useful to programmers. The paper has been influential both in academia and government.

Death
Zeller attempted to hang himself in his university apartment early on Sunday, January 2, 2011. Shortly before, he had posted a 4,000-word suicide note on his website, explaining that he had been sexually abused as a young child, and had decided to take his own life as he felt unable to escape the depression and "darkness" that the memories of this abuse had left him. He was found by officials from Princeton University. As a result of the suicide attempt, he suffered brain damage due to oxygen deprivation, and was in a coma at University Medical Center at Princeton. He died following the withdrawal of life support, on the evening of January 5, 2011, at age 27.

References

1983 births
2011 deaths
People from Middletown, Connecticut
Princeton University alumni
American computer programmers
Child sexual abuse in the United States